Loeblich & Co., full name Loeblich & Co. Kessel- und Apparatebau KG, is the name of one of the oldest operating companies in Austria (EU). Loeblich&Co. was founded as a coppersmith's workshop in the old city of Vienna in 1738 and is today operating in the fields of gas heating and professional kitchens as well as real estate development. The headquarters is in Vienna.

History 

Founded on August 20, 1738 by the coppersmith Josef Krottenthaller and taken over by Leopold Loeblich on July 20, 1823, the company-ownership and management have since then remained in the hands of the Loeblich family.
Today, in the 6th family-generation, Dr. Markus Seiller-Tarbuk is Partner since 1996 and Chairman since 1998.

Famous personalities, VIPs and institutions, such as the emperors of the K.u.K. Austro-Hungarian Monarchy, state presidents, prime minister and cabinet ministers of the Federal Austrian Republic, as well as governments, from a number of states in Europe, Africa and Asia, but also artists have since a long time been amongst the clients of Loeblich&Co..

Products 
 MUSTAPHA (filter coffee machine): filter coffee brewing machine in the coffee houses in Austria-Hungary around 1900 from Cafe Tomaselli (Salzburg), Demel's (Vienna), Cafe Sacher (Vienna), Caffe Tommaseo (Trieste), Café l'Europe (Czernowitz), Cafe New York (Budapest)
 Loeblich GWU (Gas Wasser Umlaufheizer): first floor-standing steel heater for gas in Austria, invented and designed by heating engineer Max Loeblich (b. 1901-d.1984)
 Loeblich GWS: first floor-standing steel, enameled storage water-heater
 Loeblich combi-boilers: first wall-hung compact gas boilers
 Loeblich GLM: cooperation with French manufacturer Emile Marcel Leblanc, introducing heat exchangers made of hard welded copper, till today the most compact sized wall-hung boilers of all
 Loeblich Catering Systems: worldwide supplier of professional kitchens in copper and stainless steel
 Loeblich Service: technical repair service

Distribution & Services 
 GAS HEATING (heating boilers and water heaters): Loeblich is operating as regional distributor and service organisation for the world market leader Bosch Thermotechnik and other manufacturers.
 CATERING SYSTEMS (professional kitchens, machines for professional cooking and food production): regionals sales, installation and local service in Vienna and East Austria.
 REAL ESTATE: the company is developing real estate (premises for small-business use) in Vienna.

Trivia 
The Viennese have a special nickname for the ever-present, Loeblich-servicecars in the city:

"Zitronenbomber" - lemon-bomber, which refers to the bright yellow colour of the fast driving small trucks.

1738 establishments in Austria
Companies established in 1738
Manufacturing companies based in Vienna
Austrian brands
Purveyors to the Imperial and Royal Court
Manufacturing companies established in 1738